Susan Wessels-Webber (born 12 November 1977 in Bloemfontein, Free State) is a field hockey player from South Africa who represented her country at the 2000 and 2004 Summer Olympics. She captained the women's national team at the 2003 All-Africa Games in Abuja, Nigeria, where South Africa won the title by defeating Nigeria 10–0.

References

External links

South African female field hockey players
Olympic field hockey players of South Africa
Field hockey players at the 1998 Commonwealth Games
Field hockey players at the 2000 Summer Olympics
Field hockey players at the 2004 Summer Olympics
Sportspeople from Bloemfontein
1977 births
Living people
Commonwealth Games competitors for South Africa
African Games gold medalists for South Africa
Competitors at the 2003 All-Africa Games
African Games medalists in field hockey